Troels la Cour (19 May 1889 – 10 May 1973) was a Danish sailor. He competed in the 6 Metre event at the 1948 Summer Olympics.

References

External links
 

1889 births
1973 deaths
Danish male sailors (sport)
Olympic sailors of Denmark
Sailors at the 1948 Summer Olympics – 6 Metre
Sportspeople from Aarhus